Forget Baghdad: Jews and Arabs – The Iraqi Connection is a 2002 documentary film about the Mizrahim, or Jewish community of Iraq.  It was written and directed by Samir, an Iraqi born in Baghdad in 1955 and living since 1961 in Switzerland.

The film focuses on five expatriate Iraqi Jews, most living in Israel: Shimon Ballas, Moshe (Moussa) Houri, Sami Michael, Samir Naqqash, and Ella Habiba Shohat.

The film's music is by Rabih Abou-Khalil. It was produced by Karin Koch and Samir and edited by Nina Schneider and Samir. The directors of photography were Nurith Aviv and Philippe Bellaiche.

The film was a coproduction between TagTraum Cologne, Gerd Haag, SF DRS, Teleclub, and Dschoint Ventschr Filmproduktion. It is 112 minutes in length.

The DVD, which is distributed by Arab Film Distribution, comes with a 30-minute "Making of the film" featurette. The DVD has multiple audio tracks and subtitles in English, German, French, Arabic, Hebrew, Italian, and Spanish.

Reception

 A fascinating but disorganized documentary.– Stephen Holden, The New York Times, December 4, 2003
 Grainy video and gimmicky editing give this documentary an amateurish feel, but Samir's charming, rueful interlocutors shine through.– Anya Kamenetz, Village Voice, December 2, 2003
 Samir's presentation is uninspired and too long. It's outdated, too.– V.A. Musetto, New York Post, December 5, 2003
 Explores identity, but words get in the way.– Michael O'Sullivan, The Washington Post, April 16, 2004
 Timely and thought-provoking, if a bit rambling.– Deborah Young, Variety, December 23, 2003

See also
History of the Jews in Iraq

External links

References

2002 films
German documentary films
History of Baghdad
Jewish Iraqi history
Documentary films about Jews and Judaism
2002 documentary films
Swiss documentary films
2000s English-language films
2000s Arabic-language films
2000s Hebrew-language films
2002 multilingual films
German multilingual films
Swiss multilingual films
2000s German films